The Billboard Music Award for Top Selling Song was first presented at the 2016 Billboard Music Awards. "Hello" by Adele was the first song to be awarded this honor. As of 2018, no artist has won the award multiple times. Cardi B and BTS are the most-nominated artists in this category, each having been nominated thrice. The Chainsmokers, Drake, Halsey, Imagine Dragons, Megan Thee Stallion, Charlie Puth, and The Weeknd, are the only other artists with multiple nominations, each having been nominated twice.

Recipients

References

Billboard awards